Snyders is a surname. Notable people with the surname include:

Frans Snyders (1579–1657), Flemish painter
Glenn Snyders (born 1987),  New Zealand swimmer
Sam Snyders, Canadian actor
Tom Snyders, American comedian

See also
Snyder (surname)

Occupational surnames